Marcelo Tokman Ramos (born 8 June 1967) is a Chilean economist who served as minister during the first government of Michelle Bachelet (2006–2010).

References

1967 births
Living people
Chilean people of Jewish descent
Pontifical Catholic University of Chile alumni
University of California, Berkeley alumni
Ministers of Energy of Chile
21st-century Chilean politicians
Party for Democracy (Chile) politicians